A constitutional referendum was held in American Samoa on 6 November 1973. Voters were asked to whether they approved of a new constitution, The new constitution provided for the direct election of the Governor and Lieutenant Governor, a doubling of the salaries for members of the Fono, issuing government bonds to raise money, and decentralising some powers to counties and villages.

As with the previous referendum in 1972, the proposals were rejected, with 34% in favour and 66% against.

Results
The new constitution was expected to be approved, but was rejected by nearly two-thirds of voters.

Aftermath
An identical measure on directly electing the Governor would be put before voters two more times in 1974 and August 1976 until it was approved in November 1976.

References

Referendums in American Samoa
1973 in American Samoa
American Samoa
Electoral reform referendums